Haris Smajić (born 8 March 1960) is a Bosnian retired footballer.

Club career
A product of FK Sarajevo academy, Smajić played for the team between 1978 and 1983 in the Yugoslav First League, after which he played for a  second level sides such as FK Priština, FK Spartak Subotica and FK Famos Hrasnica, before joining third level side FK Rudar Kakanj in 1988.

International career
He played for Yugoslavia national under-20 football team at the 1979 FIFA World Youth Championship, but was never capped for Yugoslavia at full international level.

References

External links
 
 Stats of players who played for Bosnian-based clubs in the Yugoslav First League 1974–1991 

1960 births
Living people
People from Breza, Bosnia and Herzegovina
Yugoslav footballers
Bosnia and Herzegovina footballers
Association football forwards
FK Sarajevo players
FC Prishtina players
FK Spartak Subotica players
FK Famos Hrasnica players
FK Rudar Kakanj players
Yugoslav First League players
Yugoslav Second League players
Yugoslavia under-21 international footballers
Bosniaks of Bosnia and Herzegovina